The 2009 South American Rugby Championship was the 31st edition of the two tiered competition of the leading national Rugby Union teams in South America.

The first phase of division A doubled as Round 3A of 2011 Rugby World Cup - Americas qualification for everyone but Paraguay. For this reason matches against Paraguay did not count in World Cup standings.  The first two of the first phase was admitted to the second phase, keeping the results of their match, with Argentina (holder).

First phase 

{| class="wikitable"
|-
!width=165|Team
!width=40|Played
!width=40|Won
!width=40|Drawn
!width=40|Lost
!width=40|For
!width=40|Against
!width=40|Difference
!width=40|Points
|- align=center
|align=left| 
|3||3||0||0||202||19||+183||9
|- align=center
|align=left| 
|3||2||0||1||122||63||+59||7
|- align=center
|align=left| 
|3||1||0||2||42||171||−129||5
|- align=center
|align=left| 
|3||0||0||3||42||155||−113||3
|}

Second phase 
{| class="wikitable"
|-
!width=165|Team
!width=40|Played
!width=40|Won
!width=40|Drawn
!width=40|Lost
!width=40|For
!width=40|Against
!width=40|Difference
!width=40|Points
|- align=center
|align=left| 
|3||3||0||0||122||15||+107||6
|- align=center
|align=left| 
|3||2||0||1||55||42||+13||4
|- align=center
|align=left| 
|3||1||0||2||15||135||−130||2
|}

Sources
https://web.archive.org/web/20120224072054/http://www.rugbyworldcup.com/qualifying/news/newsid%3D2030944.html#chile+make+winning+start+against+brazil = 25/4/2009 Results
https://web.archive.org/web/20120224072215/http://www.rugbyworldcup.com/qualifying/news/newsid%3D2031058.html#uruguay+prove+strong+brazil = 29/4/2009 Results
http://www.rugbydata.com/

 IRB – South American Championship 2009

2009
2009 rugby union tournaments for national teams
A
2009 in Argentine rugby union
rugby union
rugby union
rugby union
rugby union
International rugby union competitions hosted by Chile
International rugby union competitions hosted by Uruguay